Funeral payments are a social security payment in the United Kingdom that are part of the Social Fund. They are to help with the costs of a funeral. To be eligible for a funeral payment you or your partner must be in receipt of one of the following income related benefits:

Income Support
Income-related Employment and Support Allowance
Income-based Jobseeker’s Allowance
Pension Credit (guarantee or savings credit)
Housing Benefit  
Working Tax Credit (disability or severe disability element)
Child Tax Credit (at a rate higher than £545 per year)
Universal Credit

England and Wales
In England and Wales, further entitlement conditions must also be met.
You can claim a Funeral Expenses Payment if: 
 you live in England or Wales;
 you were the partner of the person who died;
 you were a close relative or close friend of the person who died and it is reasonable for you to accept responsibility for the funeral costs, because you were in close regular contact with the person who has died.

A close relative means
 a parent, father-in-law, mother-in-law or step-parent
 a son, son-in-law, step-son or step-son-in-law
 a daughter, daughter-in-law, step-daughter or step-daughter-in-law 
 a brother or brother-in-law
 a sister or sister-in-law

If there is another close relative of the person who has died who is not getting a qualifying benefit, their situation may need to be considered.

You cannot get a payment as a close relative or close friend of the person who has died if:
 the person who has died had a partner when they died;
 there is a parent, son or daughter of the person who has died who is not getting a qualifying benefit
  and whose relationship with the person who has died had not broken down.

Scotland 

In Scotland, Funeral payments has been replaced by Funeral Support Payment, a new benefit delivered by Social Security Scotland.

References

External links
Gov.uk

Social Fund (UK)
Social security in the United Kingdom